Meja Thermal Power Station is an upcoming coal-based thermal power plant located in Meja Tehsil in Allahabad district, Uttar Pradesh. The power plant is owned by the Meja Urja Nigam Private Limited (MUNPL) a joint venture between NTPC Limited and Uttar Pradesh Rajya Vidyut Utpadan Nigam.
The planned capacity of the power plant is 1320 MW (2x660MW). Meja Thermal Power Station is an upcoming coal-based thermal power plant located in Meja Tehsil in Allahabad district, Uttar Pradesh.

Capacity
The planned capacity of the power plant is 1320 MW (2x660MW).

Future expansion
The state government decided in July 2014 to add two more units of 660 MW to the power plant as part second stage of the project. But work on the same is yet to start.

References
 http://mejantpc.com

Coal-fired power stations in Uttar Pradesh
Allahabad district
2018 establishments in Uttar Pradesh
Energy infrastructure completed in 2018